The Brandon-Bell-Collier House is a house in Fulton, Callaway County, Missouri, in the state of Missouri in the central United States.  It was built in stages between about 1862 and 1917.  From 1900 to 1902, it was owned by Fulton architect Morris Frederick Bell, who undertook a major remodelling, expanding the house to two stories and incorporating elements of the Queen Anne and Colonial Revival architectural styles.

The house was listed on the National Register of Historic Places in 1998. It is located in the Court Street Historic Residential District.

References 

Individually listed contributing properties to historic districts on the National Register in Missouri
Houses on the National Register of Historic Places in Missouri
Queen Anne architecture in Missouri
Houses completed in 1901
Houses in Callaway County, Missouri
National Register of Historic Places in Callaway County, Missouri